The 2007 Rexall Grand Prix of Edmonton was the eighth round of the 2007 Champ Car World Series Season, and was held on July 22, 2007 at Rexall Speedway in Edmonton, Alberta, Canada.  The race was won by Sébastien Bourdais followed by Justin Wilson and Graham Rahal.

Qualifying results

Will Power won his fourth career pole position by nipping Justin Wilson by .007 of a second.  Power knocked the front wing off his car while going off course during his final lap, but Wilson was unable to better Power's earlier best lap.  Sébastien Bourdais was only fourth fastest on Saturday but his top time from Friday secured him a front row beside his championship rival Power.  Tristan Gommendy will not take part in the race after suffering a back injury when he contacted the wall in Friday's qualification session.  He was replaced by Mario Dominguez, who is searching for a full-time ride in the series and was in Edmonton driving the Minardi two-seater.

Race

Going into the race Sebastien Bourdais found himself in an unusual position: third place in the season points standings behind Robert Doornbos and Will Power.  Starting from second on the grid next to Power, Bourdais swept around the pole-sitter on the outside through Edmonton's wide first turn.  Bourdais led the race until his first pit stop on lap 21.  Bourdais was forced to wait critical seconds for Katherine Legge to enter her pit stall and lost two positions.

Power now led the race in front of Justin Wilson and Bourdais.  He led until his second pit stop on lap 49.  Wilson stayed out an extra lap, coming in on lap 50, but Bourdais stayed out until lap 52, which proved to be the critical strategic move of the race.  Bourdais came out in the lead after his stop.  Bourdais now led in front of Wilson and Graham Rahal, with Power back in fourth place.

Disaster hit Power on lap 66 when the steering rack on his Panoz broke.  Meanwhile, Robert Doornbos', who spent the early stages of the race stuck deep in the field unable to improve much on his 11th place grid position, tangled with the lapped car of Alex Tagliani on lap 69.  Tagliani was knocked out of the race, while Doornbos was able to continue, but a lap down.

Bourdais cruised to his fourth victory of the year, followed by Justin Wilson and teammate Graham Rahal.  Even more impressive was the turnaround in the season points championship.  At the end of the race Bourdais led Doornbos by 20 and Will Power by 25 in his drive for an unprecedented fourth consecutive Champ Car title.

Caution flags

Notes

 Fastest Lap Sébastien Bourdais: 58.653 (Lap 93)
 New Race Record Sébastien Bourdais :  1:45:41.953
 Average Speed 107.517 mph

Championship standings after the race

Drivers' Championship standings

 Note: Only the top five positions are included.

Attendance
Race weekend attendance was 167,152. This was down slightly from the 171,391 who attended in 2006.

References

External links
 Full Weekend Times & Results
 Race Box Score

2007 in Champ Car
2
Rexall Edmonton Indy
Rexall Edmonton Indy
Rexall Edmonton Indy